Kuo-Kuang Motor Transportation is a bus company in Taiwan.

History

Kuo-Kuang was established on July 1, 2001 as a result of the privatization of state-owned . After the state-run company announced its intention to close, some 1,090 employees each contributed NT$300,000 in order to raise the funds necessary to purchase the firm's assets and relaunch the service as Kuo-Kuang. As of 2013, the company's fleet comprised more than 1,200 buses. In January 2016, the final Greyhound buses still being used on regular Kuo-Kuang routes were retired. In November that year, Kuo-Kuang's Taipei Main Station location was moved following the demolition of its historic Taipei West Bus Station home.

Incidents
On 23 November 2015, the driver of a Kuo-Kuang bus traveling from Taipei to Taichung pulled over on a freeway after an electrical fire broke out. While the driver and passengers were waiting outside the bus, a truck drove into their vehicle, killing the driver and one passenger and injuring 13 more.

On 2 June 2017, a Kuo-Kuang bus heading from Pingtung to Taichung crashed in poor weather, killing one person and injuring 31 others.

On 10 June 2019, a southbound Kuo-Kuang bus collided with the rare of a flatbed semi-trailer along National Freeway 1 killing the bus driver and injuring 7 passengers.

On 13 July 2020, a Kuo-Kuang bus en route to Taipei rear-ended a truck on National Freeway 1 injuring 13 passengers.

References 

Bus transportation in Taiwan
Taiwanese companies established in 2001
Transport companies established in 2001
Companies based in New Taipei